Events in the year 1777 in Norway.

Incumbents
Monarch: Christian VII

Events

Arts and literature

Births
7 February - Severin Løvenskiold, nobleman and politician (died 1856)
18 February - Andreas Arntzen, politician (died 1837)
12 April - Caspar Peter Hagerup, civil servant (died 1840)
20 April - Hans Jørgen Reutz Synnestvedt, military officer and politician (died 1841)
5 June - Oluf Borch de Schouboe, politician and Minister (died 1844)
3 August - Peter Motzfeldt, politician and Minister (died 1854)
12 September - Hans Jacob Arnold Jensen, military officer and politician (died 1853)

Full date unknown
Christian Krohg, politician and Minister (died 1828)
Peder Tollefsen Ilsaas, politician
Nicolai Niels Nielsen, priest and politician (died 1854)
Jacob Andreas Wille, priest and politician (died 1850)

Deaths
22 May – Nicolaus Christian Friis, priest and writer (born 1714).

See also

References